Sigmund Neumann (May 1, 1904 - October 22, 1962) was a German political scientist and sociologist. Born in Leipzig but emigrating first to London and then to the United States following the rise of Nazi Germany, Neumann was a leading proponent of the Second Thirty Years War-outlook on World War I and World War II and was awarded honorary doctorates from both Munich and Berlin Universities following his return to Germany in 1949. Before coming to the United States in 1934 to join the faculty of Wesleyan University in Middletown, Connecticut, Neumann taught at the Deutsche Hochschule fur Politik and the London School of Economics, among other institutions. He also served as a visiting professor at Columbia, Harvard, Yale, Amherst and Mount Holyoke. During his tenure at Wesleyan, Neumann served as Lecturer, Government & Social Science (1934–39); Associate Professor, Social Sciences (1939–44); and Professor, Government (1944–60).

"[A] gifted scholar in government and politics," Neumann was the author of many books, including his then ground breaking The Future in Perspective (1946) and Introduction to the History of Sociology (co-author 1948); he was also a contributor to many professional publications and served as consultant to the U.S. Office of Strategic Services in 1944–45. At Wesleyan, in addition to his teaching and research, he served as director of the Center for Advanced Studies (now the Center for Humanities) (1959–1962), restarted and supervised the Wesleyan Press Archives in the Public Affairs Center (beginning in 1958), and became a mentor to many students.

Death
Neumann died in Middletown and is buried in Wunne Wah Jet or Indian Hill Cemetery with a headstone that reads:
A man of angel's wit and singular learning;
I know not his fellow.
For where is the man of that gentleness, lowliness and affability.
And as time requireth, a man of marvelous mirth and pastimes;
And sometimes of as sad a gravity;
A man for all seasons.

References

Notes
 

1904 births
1962 deaths
Burials at Indian Hill Cemetery
Writers from Leipzig
German sociologists
German political scientists
Columbia University faculty
Wesleyan University faculty
German emigrants to the United States
German male writers
20th-century political scientists